Vancho Dimovski (born 4 April 1979) is a former Macedonian handball player and former member of the Macedonian national team. In 2015 he became a sports director for RK Rabotnički, but in February 2016 he left Rabotnički and became a team-manager at RK Metalurg Skopje.

References

1979 births
Living people
Macedonian male handball players
Sportspeople from Skopje
RK Vardar players